Misael Omar Cubillos Ramos (born 6 February 1996) is a Chilean footballer who last played for Coquimbo Unido in the Primera B de Chile.

Career
He came to Deportes Iquique at the age of 13, after being discovered in a sport event called Juegos Bicentenario 2009, playing along with Colegio Deportivo. Along with Deportes Iquique, on 2012 he became champion of Chilean Youth Football U17 Championship, where played the Chilean international goalkeeper Brayan Cortés, too. Later, he joined to the professional squad at the age of 16, making his debut at the Chilean Primera División in a match against Palestino on January 26, 2013.

After Deportes Iquique was relegated to Primera B, on 2021 season he signed with Coquimbo Unido.

Honours

Club
Deportes Iquique
 Copa Chile: 2013–14

Coquimbo Unido
 Primera B (1): 2021

References

External links
 

1996 births
Living people
People from Iquique
Chilean footballers
Chilean Primera División players
Primera B de Chile players
Deportes Iquique footballers
Coquimbo Unido footballers
Association football midfielders